Cullen James Grace (born 20 December 1999) is a New Zealand rugby union player who plays for the  in Super Rugby and  in the Bunnings NPC. His position is lock. He was named in the Crusaders squad for the 2020 season.

Grace made his All Blacks debut on 7 November 2020 against Australia at Brisbane. In 2022, He was called into the Māori All Blacks squad for the match against Ireland.

Reference list

External links

 

1999 births
New Zealand rugby union players
Māori All Blacks players
Living people
Rugby union locks
Crusaders (rugby union) players
Canterbury rugby union players
New Zealand international rugby union players
Rugby union players from Hāwera
Rugby union flankers
Rugby union number eights